The livenka or Livenskaya garmoshka is a specific variety of accordion used in Russian folk music, specifically in the region around the town of Livny (Oryol Oblast), from which the instrument takes its name.

Description
The livenka is a unisonoric instrument, meaning that each button produces the same tone, regardless of the direction of the bellows.
The right-hand buttons (of which there may be 12 to 15) play the notes of the obikhodnyy pitch set, which may also be thought of as a series of overlapping Mixolydian modes. (Banin, A.A. 1997. p.161)
The left-hand levers play intervals of thirds or fourths, so that adjacent levers operated simultaneously will play a triad.
The livenka has a very long bellows, when compared to other accordions—sometimes having forty folds, and extending to over a meter in length.

History
The name of the inventor of the livenka was not preserved.  It is believed to have been developed in the second half of the 19th century as a modification of existing German or Russian button accordions.

Bibliography
Banin A.A. Russkaia instrumentalnaia muzyka folklornoi traditsii. Moscow, 1997. (p.159-163)
Blagodatov G.I. Russkaia garmonika. Leningrad, 1960.
Egorov S.P. Noveishyi prakticheskii samouchitel dlia ruchnoi garmoniki roialnogo stroia - viatskoi, livenskoi i klarnetnoi. "Baian". Smolensk, 1903.
Mirek A.M. Spravochnik po garmonikam. Moscow, 1968.
Mirek A.M. I zvuchit garmonika. Moscow, 1979.
Rodin E. Novyi samouchitel i sbornik pesen dlia odnoriadnoi livenskoi garmonii. Saint Petersburg, 1906.

External links 
 Ливенская гармошка (Livenskaya garmoshka), in Russian

Accordion
Russian inventions